The Demonata is a young adult horror/fantasy series by author Darren Shan. It deals with the world of demons. The series is told by three different protagonists: Grubbs Grady, Kernel Fleck, and Bec MacConn. The series is notable for its extensive graphic violence, despite being aimed towards children. This has caused the series some controversy, but ultimately aided in its popularity. Author Darren Shan being praised for his more mature approach to his writing, and his ability to reflect the children's mental growth with each iteration in the series.

Works

Publishing order
Cover illustration copyright Melvyn Grant
Lord Loss – 6 June 2005 (5 October 2005 in the US)
Demon Thief – 5 October 2005 (7 June 2006 in the US)
Slawter – 1 June 2006 (1 November 2006 in the US)
Bec – 2 October 2006 (1 May 2007 in the US)
Blood Beast – June, 2007 (1 November 2007 in the US)
Demon Apocalypse – October, 2007 (1 May 2008 in the US)
Death's Shadow – May, 2008 (1 November 2008 in the US)
Wolf Island – 1 October 2008 (1 May 2009 in the US)
Dark Calling – 1 May 2009 (October 2009 in US)
Hell's Heroes  – 1 October 2009 (May 2010 in the US)

Storyline order
 Bec (Between 351 AD and 400 AD, during ancient Ireland's conversion from Paganism to Christianity, about 1600 years before Demon Thief)
 Demon Thief (Mid 1970s, about 30 years before Lord Loss)
 Lord Loss (Early 21st century)
 Slawter (Fourteen months after the end of Lord Loss)
 Blood Beast (About a year after Slawter)
 Demon Apocalypse (Directly following Blood Beast)
 Death's Shadow (Six months after Demon Apocalypse and roughly parallel to Wolf Island and Dark Calling)
 Wolf Island (Roughly parallel to Dark Calling)
 Dark Calling (Roughly parallel to Wolf Island)
 Hell's Heroes (Directly following Dark Calling'')

Narrators
The narrator of each book in the Demonata series shifts between the three protagonists of the series; Grubbs Grady, Kernel Fleck and Bec MacConn.

Plot
The series centers around three protagonists: Grubitsch "Grubbs" Grady, Cornelius "Kernel" Fleck and Bec MacConn. Although they meet each other at various points, they are from separate times; Grubbs lives in the present day, Kernel in the 1970s and Bec in around 450AD. The books detail their fight against the demon master Lord Loss, his many demon familiars and the mysterious Shadow, who promises to destroy the human universe and to even stop death. Together with The Disciples, the main characters attempt to thwart the Demonata from destroying the world.

Characters

Grady-MacGrigor family tree

Overview

References

External links
Author's official website

The Demonata
Demon novels
Horror novel series
HarperCollins books